Dardanelle School District is a public school district in Dardanelle, Arkansas, United States. The school district provides comprehensive education to residents of northern Yell County, in the Arkansas River Valley area. It also serves the unincorporated area of Delaware in Logan County.

In 2012, Dardanelle School District and its high school were recognized in the AP District of the Year Awards program in the College Board's 3rd Annual Honor Roll that consisted of 539 U.S. public school districts (6 in Arkansas) that simultaneously achieved increases in access to AP® courses for a broader number of students and improved the rate at which their AP students earned scores of 3 or higher on an AP Exam.

History 
In 1979 the Carden Bot school district merged into the Dardanelle district

Schools 
 Dardanelle High School (9-12)
 Dardanelle Middle School (7-8)
 Dardanelle Elementary School (3-6)
 Dardanelle Primary School (K-2)

References

External links

 

School districts in Arkansas
Education in Yell County, Arkansas
Education in Pope County, Arkansas
Education in Logan County, Arkansas